This is a list of bridges and viaducts in Ecuador, including those for pedestrians and vehicular traffic.

Historical and architectural interest bridges

Major road and railway bridges 

See also 

 Transport in Ecuador
 Highways in Ecuador
 Empresa de Ferrocarriles Ecuatorianos
 Geography of Ecuador
 List of rivers of Ecuador

Notes and references 
 Notes

 

 Others references

Further reading

External links 

 
 
 
 

Ecuador
 
Bridges
Bridges